Blood Bathory is an EP by Italian singer Lord Vampyr, released in 2007. It is a loose concept album, whose lyrics are based on old Hungarian and Romanian vampire-related folktales.

The EP's cover references Darkthrone's popular 1994 album Transilvanian Hunger, which itself references Mayhem's 1993 live album Live in Leipzig.

Track listing

Personnel
 Lord Vampyr (Alessandro Nunziati) — vocals
 Aeshla (Francesco Struglia) — drums
 Alexiel — keyboards
 Nighthorn (Silvano Leone) — bass
 Nepesh-Ra (Cristiano Trionfera) — guitars
 S.K. — guitars

External links
 Lord Vampyr's official website

2007 EPs
Lord Vampyr albums